Dangiwacha is a small town located in Baramulla district, of Kashmir region, India.

Cities and towns in Baramulla district